Mandau is the traditional weapon of the Dayak people of Borneo. It is also known as Parang Ilang among the Bidayuh, Iban and Penan people, Malat by the Kayan people or Baieng by the Kenyah people or Bandau by Lun Bawang or Pelepet/Felepet by Lundayeh. Mandau is mostly ceremonial. However, a less elaborate version called Ambang is used as an everyday practical tool.

Associated with the Headhunting Ceremony, where people would gather to attack other tribes, and gather heads to be used in various festivities, Mandau is both a work of art in itself and a weapon.

Description 
Characteristics for the Mandau is that the blade is shaped convexly on one side and somewhat concavely on the other side. The blade is mostly made of tempered metals, with exquisite vine-works and inlaid brass. The hilt is made from animal horns, such as deer's horns, although some variations with human bones and fragrant wood also have been found. Both the hilt and scabbard are elaborately carved and plumed. Details of carvings vary from tribe to tribe, but mostly depict creatures or, if human bones were used, anthropomorphic deities. A Mandau is often accompanied with a whittling knife, generally referred to as Pisau raut.

Ambang 
Ambang is a term used for Mandau that is made from common steel. Often it is also made as souvenir. For the untrained eye and those who are not familiar with the Mandau, will not be able to distinguish the difference between a Mandau and an Ambang because of the outlook appearance that looks almost similar. However the two are actually very different. If one examines in detail, the differences are very obvious that the engravings can be found on the blade and it is embedded with gold, copper or silver. The Mandau holds a stronger edge and with flexibility, as it is said that the Mandau is made from iron ore obtained from rocky mountains forged by skilled blacksmiths. Whereas the Ambang is made from ordinary steel.

In popular culture 
As a symbol of Dayak culture, mandau is frequently depicted in various ways. Indonesian provinces of East Kalimantan, West Kalimantan, and Central Kalimantan all featured mandau in their provincial emblem. Paramilitary organization Mandau Talawang Pancasila was named after the weapon. Insignia of military command Kodam VI/Mulawarman and Kodam XII/Tanjungpura in Indonesia also featured mandau.

See also 

 Jimpul
Pandat
 Langgai Tinggang
 Niabor

References

External links 

 Parang Ilang (Iban), Malat/Mandau (Kayan) or Baieng (Kenyah)

Blade weapons
Southeast Asian swords
Weapons of Indonesia
Weapons of Malaysia